Kiril Vajarov (18 February 1988 – 18 April 2009) was a Bulgarian ice-hockey goaltender, who played for HC Slavia Sofia.

Career
Vajarov was a three time Bulgarian champion with HC Slavia Sofia.

International career
Vajarov was a member of the Bulgaria men's national ice hockey team this year, which managed to finish 4th in the IIHF Division 2 World Championship. He played three games in the tournament. He was also a member of the country's U18 and U20 teams.

Death
He was stabbed to death on 18 April as he was visiting a nightclub in Sofia, Bulgaria. The 21-year-old was celebrating the birthday of a friend, who was also killed in the incident.

See also
 List of ice hockey players who died during their playing career

References

External links

1988 births
2009 murders in Bulgaria
2009 deaths
2009 murders in Europe
Bulgarian ice hockey goaltenders
Bulgarian murder victims
Deaths by stabbing in Bulgaria
HC Slavia Sofia players
Male murder victims
People murdered in Bulgaria